Lake Leatherwood Park is a municipal park on the north side of Eureka Springs, Arkansas. The dam, along with roadways, recreational facilities, and other elements of the park, were built in the 1930s by work crews of the Civilian Conservation Corps (CCC) with funding from the federal government's Soil Conservation Service.

The park is the subject of several listings on the National Register of Historic Places.  Those recreational facilities built by the CCC in the 1930s were listed in 1992; the dam was also nominated at that time, but it was never formally listed, and its listing is recorded by the National Park Service as pending.  The entire park was listed as a historic district in 1998.

Images

See also
National Register of Historic Places listings in Carroll County, Arkansas

References

External links

Park web site

 Colonial Revival architecture in Arkansas
 Buildings and structures completed in 1942
 Buildings and structures in Eureka Springs, Arkansas
 Parks on the National Register of Historic Places in Arkansas
 Historic districts on the National Register of Historic Places in Arkansas
 Protected areas of Carroll County, Arkansas
1942 establishments in Arkansas
 National Register of Historic Places in Carroll County, Arkansas